Egg! Egg! A Hardboiled Story (alternative title The Softening of the Egg) is a 1975 Swedish black comedy film directed by Hans Alfredson, starring Gösta Ekman, Max von Sydow and Birgitta Andersson. Alfredson won the award for Best Director at the 11th Guldbagge Awards.

Cast
 Gösta Ekman as The Son
 Max von Sydow as The Father
 Birgitta Andersson as The Mother
 Anna Godenius as Girl
 Hans Alfredson as Tramp
 Börje Ahlstedt as Man in Commercial
 Ingvar Petrow (as Ingvar Petrov)
 Jim Hughes as American
 Stig Ossian Ericson as Worker
 Jan Wirén as Worker
 Meg Westergren as Woman in Commercial
 Ola Thulin as Doctor

References

External links

 

1975 films
1970s black comedy films
Films directed by Hasse Alfredson
Swedish black comedy films
1970s Swedish-language films
Films whose director won the Best Director Guldbagge Award
1975 comedy films
1975 drama films
1970s Swedish films